The Tharu people are an ethnic group indigenous to the Terai in southern Nepal and northern India. They speak Tharu languages. They are recognized as an official nationality by the Government of Nepal. In the Indian Terai, they live foremost in Uttarakhand, Uttar Pradesh and Bihar. The Government of India recognizes the Tharu people as a scheduled tribe.

Etymology 
The word  (thāru) is thought to be derived from sthavir meaning follower of Theravada Buddhism. The Tharu people in the central Nepali Terai see themselves as the original people of the land and descendants of Gautama Buddha. Rana Tharu people of western Nepal connect the name to the Thar Desert and understand themselves as descendants of Rajputs who migrated to the forests in the 16th century.
Possible is also that the name is derived from the classical Tibetan words mtha'-ru'i brgyud, meaning the 'country at the border', which the Tibetan scholar Taranatha used in the 16th century in his book on the history of Buddhism.

Distribution 

As of 2011, the Tharu population of Nepal was censused at 1,737,470 people, or 6.6% of the total population. In 2009, the majority of Tharu people were estimated to live in Nepal. There are several endogamous subgroups of Tharu that are scattered over most of the Terai:
 Rana Tharu in the Kailali and Kanchanpur Districts of the far western Nepali Terai; also in India, in Udham Singh Nagar district, Uttarakhand and Kheri district of Uttar Pradesh.
 Kathariya Tharu mostly in Kailali District and in India;
 Sonha Tharu in Surkhet District;
 Dangaura Tharu in the western Terai: Dang-Deukhuri, Banke, Bardia, Kailali, Kanchanpur, Rupandehi and Kapilvastu Districts;
 Chitwan Tharu in central Terai: Sindhuli, Chitwan and Nawalparasi Districts;
 Kochila Tharu in eastern Terai: Saptari, Bara, Parsa, Rautahat, Sarlahi, Mahottari and Udayapur districts;
 Danuwar in eastern Terai: Udayapur, Saptari and Morang Districts;
Lampucchwa Tharu in Morang and Sunsari District.

Smaller numbers of Tharu people reside in the adjacent Indian districts Champaran in Bihar, Gorakhpur, Basti and Gonda districts in Uttar Pradesh, and Khatima in Uttarakhand. In 2001, Tharu people were the largest of five scheduled tribes in Uttarakhand, with a population of 2,56,129 accounting for 33.4% of all scheduled tribes. In the same year, they constituted 77.4% of the total tribal population of Uttar Pradesh with a population of 83,544.

History
According to Al-Biruni, Tharu people have been living in the eastern Terai since at least the 10th century. They claim descent from the Śākya and Koliya peoples who lived in ancient city of Kapilvastu. The Rana Tharus in western Nepal claim to be of Rajput origin and to have migrated from the Thar Desert in Rajasthan to Nepal's Far Western Terai region after the defeat of Maharana Pratap against a Mughal emperor in the 16th century. Most scholars refute this claim.

13th century
The Tabaqat-i Nasiri chronicle of the Islamic world which contains records of an expedition by Muhammad bin Bakhtiyar Khalji into Kamrup region between Gauda and Tibet in 1205 A.D refers to the resident people as Kunch (Koch), Mej/Meg (Mech), Tiharu (Taru) as having Mongoloid appearances. These people impressed the Turkic Muslims who had similar features as them, like slanting eyes, snub noses, high cheek bones, yellow complexion of the Mongols and who spoke a different language than in the rest of the subcontinent.

Modern history (1700–1990)
Following the unification of Nepal in the late 18th century, members of the ruling families received land grants in the Terai and were entitled to collect revenue from those who cultivated the land. The Tharu people became bonded labourers in a system also known as Kamaiya. In 1854, Jung Bahadur Rana enforced the so-called Muluki Ain, a General Code, in which both Hindu and non-Hindu castes were classified based on their habits of food and drink. Tharu people were categorized as "Paani Chalne Masinya Matwali", i.e. touchable enslavable alcohol drinking group, together with several other ethnic minorities.

In the late 1950s, the World Health Organization supported the Nepalese government in eradicating malaria in the forests of the central Terai. Following the malaria eradication program using DDT in the 1960s, a large and heterogeneous non-Tharu population from the Nepali hills, Bhutan, Sikkim and India settled in the region.
In the western Terai, many Tharu families lost the land, which they used to cultivate, to these immigrants and were forced to work as Kamaiya.

When the first protected areas were established in Chitwan, Tharu communities were forced to relocate from their traditional lands. They were denied any right to own land and thus forced into a situation of landlessness and poverty. When the Chitwan National Park was designated, Nepalese soldiers destroyed the villages located inside the national park, burned down houses, and beat the people who tried to plough their fields. Some threatened Tharu people at gun point to leave.

Recent history (1990–present)
After the overthrow of the Panchayat system in Nepal in 1990, the Tharu ethnic association Tharu Kalyankari Sabha joined the umbrella organisation of ethnic groups, a predecessor of the Nepal Federation of Indigenous Nationalities.

In July 2000, the Government of Nepal abolished the practice of bonded labour prevalent under the Kamaiya system and declared loan papers illegal. Kamaiya families were thus enfranchised from debts supposedly incurred, but were also rendered homeless and jobless. Bonded labour shifted to children who work in other households for food for themselves and their families, but rarely with access to school education.

During the Nepalese Civil War, Tharu people experienced an intense period of violence, were recruited by and coerced to help the Maoists, especially in western Nepal; several Tharu leaders were assassinated and infrastructure of the Tharu organisation Backward Society Education destroyed.
After the Comprehensive Peace Accord was signed in 2006, Tharu organisations postulated an autonomous Tharu state within a federal Nepal, emphasising equality of opportunity and equal distribution of land and resources.
In 2009, Tharu people across the Nepal Terai protested against the government's attempt to categorize them as Madheshi people.

Culture

The Tharu people comprise several groups who speak different dialects and differ in traditional dress, customs, rituals and social organization.
They consider themselves as a people of the forest. In Chitwan, they have lived in the forests for hundreds of years practising a short fallow shifting cultivation. They plant rice, wheat, mustard, maize and lentils, but also collect forest products such as wild fruits, vegetables, medicinal plants and materials to build their houses; hunt deer, rabbit and wild boar, and go fishing in the rivers and oxbow lakes.

The Rana Tharus never went abroad for employment, a life that kept them isolated in their own localities. They developed a unique culture free from the influence of adjacent India, or from the ethnic groups in Nepal's mountains. The most striking aspects of their environment are the decorated rice containers, colorfully painted verandahs and outer walls of their homes using only available materials like clay, mud, cow dung and grass. Much of the rich design is rooted in devotional activities and passed on from one generation to the next, occasionally introducing contemporary elements such as a bus or an airplane.
A statue of Maharana Pratap was established in Mira Bara Rana, Udham Singh Nagar district. A museum has been constructed to display agricultural implements, food, heritage and lifestyle-related items of Tharu people.

Language
Tharu communities in different parts of Nepal and India do not share the same language. Several speak various endemic Tharu languages. In western Nepal and adjacent parts of India, Tharus speak variants of Hindi, Urdu and Awadhi. In and near central Nepal, they speak a variant of Bhojpuri. In eastern Nepal, they speak a variant of Maithili. More standard versions of these dialects are widely spoken by non-Tharu neighbors in the same areas so that there are no important linguistic barriers between Tharus and their neighbors. However, there are linguistic barriers between these dialects standing in the way of communication between Tharus from different regions.

Folk dance
Sakhiya dance is a traditional dance of Tharu community performed during the Dashain and Tihar festivals by the unmaried young girls and boys.

Religion
The spiritual beliefs and moral values of the Tharu people are closely linked to the natural environment. The pantheon of their gods comprises a large number of deities that live in the forest. They are asked for support before entering the forest.
Tharus have been influenced by Hinduism for several centuries. However, since the 1990s, some Tharu groups in the Nepal Terai converted to Buddhism in the wake of ethnic movements for social inclusion and against the religious hierarchy imposed by the Hindu State.

Marriage system
Traditionally, Rana Tharus practice arranged marriages, which parents often arrange already during the couple's childhood. The wedding ceremony is held when the bride and groom reach marriable age. The ceremony lasts several days, involving all the relatives of the two families. 
Among the Rana Tharus in Bardiya District, it is also custom to arrange marriage of a daughter in exchange for getting a bride for a son or vice versa. Parents give particular attention to the working capacity of the groom and bride, rather than the economic situation of the in-law family. Polygamous marriages are also customary among Tharu people, with rich land holders marrying between two and five women.

Household structure
In the western Terai, Rana Tharu traditionally live in Badaghar called longhouses with big families of up to 31 members from four generations and between one and eight married couples. The household members pool their labour force, contribute their income, share the expenditure and use one kitchen. The eldest male person in charge of Badaghar households and associated land holdings is called Mukhiya. He assigns tasks to family members, is responsible for the family's social activities and has to report income and expenditures annually to the family. When families were forced to resettle, some of these Badaghar households broke up into smaller units of up to six households.

Social structure
Tharu people in Rajapur, Nepal are either landholders, cultivate land on a sharecropping basis or are landless agricultural labourers.

Tharus from the mid west and far west of Nepal have been practicing the Badghar system, where a Badghar is elected chief of a village or a small group of villages for a year. The election generally takes place in January or February after celebrating the Maghi Festival and after completing major farming activities. In most cases, each household in the village which engages in farming has one voting right for electing a Badghar. Thus the election is based on a count of households count rather than a headcount. The role of the Badghar is to work for the welfare of the village. The Badghar direct the villagers to repair canals or streets when needed. They also oversee and manages the cultural traditions of the villages. They have an authority of punishing those who do not follow their orders or who go against the welfare of the village. Generally the Badghar has a Chaukidar to help him. With the consent of the villagers the Badghar may appoint a "Guruwa" or "Bharara" who is the medic and chief priest of the village.

Tharu people are mainly involved in farming, thus irrigating fields is important. Tharus in western Nepal built canals that irrigate thousands of hectares of land. Hundreds of years ago, without using any sophisticated tools, they built hundreds of kilometers of irrigation canals in Nepal's Kailali and Bardiya districts. These canals are used by several villages. Its water and diversion works need to be managed fairly. For this purpose, the Badghars of different villages elect a person for the position of Chaudhary to manage a canal system. When needed, the Chaudhary orders the Badghars to send people to repair or build the canals. In most cases the Badghars and Chaudharis are unpaid leaders of the community. However, they are exempt from compulsory physical labor for the betterment of the society. As a token of respect, the community members may also help them in farming for a day free of cost.

Genetics
Genetic studies on Y-DNA of Tharu people from two villages in Chitwan district and one in Morang district revealed a high presence of Haplogroup O-M117 (33.3%) followed by Haplogroup H (25.7%), Haplogroup J2a-M410(xM68, M47, M67, M158) (9.9%), Haplogroup R1a (8.8%), Haplogroup R2a-M124 (4.7%), Haplogroup J2b2-M12/M102/M241(xM99) (4.1%), Haplogroup D-M174 (3.5%), Haplogroup L-M20 (2.3%), Haplogroup O-M95 (2.3%), Haplogroup E-M35 (1.8%), Haplogroup O-M134(xM117) (1.2%), Haplogroup Q-M242 (1.2%), Haplogroup C1b1a1-M356 (0.6%), and Haplogroup K-M9(xM70, M20, M214, M74) (0.6%). A genetic study on mtDNA of several Tharus in Nepal showed that the total of South Asian mtDNA haplogroups ranges from 31.6% to 67.5% in the Tharu while the total of East Asian mtDNA haplogroups ranges from 32.5% to 68.4% depending on the Tharu group studied.
A genetic survey of Tharus from Nepal, Uttarakhand and Uttar Pradesh showed that they have both a South Asian and an East Asian human genetic origin.

Resistance to malaria 
The Tharu are famous for their ability to survive in the malarial parts of the Terai that were deadly to outsiders.
Contemporary medical research comparing Tharu with other ethnic groups living nearby found an incidence of malaria nearly seven times lower among Tharu. The researchers believed such a large difference pointed to genetic factors rather than behavioural or dietary differences. This was confirmed by follow-up investigation finding genes for thalassemia in nearly all Tharu studied.

Notable Tharu people 

 Barsha Lekhi - Miss Nepal International 2016
 Saraswati Chaudhary - Nepalese female track and field athlete
 Tilak Ram Tharu -  Nepalese track and field athlete
 Shanta Chaudhary - Nepali politician, Nepalese Women Writer
 Ganga Chaudhary Satgauwa (Ganga Tharu) - Nepali politician
 Resham Lal Chaudhary (Resham Chaudhary) -  Nepali politician
 Mamta Chaudhary, a Nepali cricketer
 Dipendra Chaudhary (1980-), a Nepalese cricketer
 Bishnu Prasad Chaudhari Tharu - Nepali politician
 Indrajit Tharu, a Nepalese politician
 Mangal Prasad Tharu, a Nepalese politician
 Puran Rana Tharu, a Nepalese politician
 Ramcharan Chaudhari (Tharu), a Nepalese politician
 Sant Kumar Tharu, a Nepalese politician
 Arti Rana - Indian social entrepreneur

References

Further reading

External links

Tharu Nepal - NGO promoting cultural exchange via community projects

Ethnic groups in Nepal
Scheduled Tribes of Uttar Pradesh
Social groups of Bihar
Scheduled Tribes of Uttarakhand
Schools of Indian painting
Adivasi
Indigenous peoples of Nepal
Gorakhpur district
Ethnonyms